Robert Pakenham (c.1744 – 7 July 1775), styled The Honourable from 1756, was an Anglo-Irish politician. 

Pakenham was the son of Thomas Pakenham, 1st Baron Longford and Elizabeth Pakenham, 1st Countess of Longford. He gained the rank of captain in the 33rd Regiment of Foot. Pakenham was the Member of Parliament for Longford County in the Irish House of Commons between 1768 and his death in 1775.

References

Year of birth uncertain
1775 deaths
18th-century Anglo-Irish people
33rd Regiment of Foot officers
Irish MPs 1769–1776
Members of the Parliament of Ireland (pre-1801) for County Longford constituencies
Robert
Younger sons of barons